Tsaoyang-Yichang Campaign 1 May – 18 June 1940

Japan 
(Early May - Late June 1940)

11th Army - Lt. General Waichirō Sonobe [5]
 Northern Pincer
 3rd Division - General Masataka Yamawaki  [1,4]
 5th Infantry Brigade
 6th Infantry Regiment
 68th Infantry Regiment
 29th Infantry Brigade
 18th Infantry Regiment
 34th Infantry Regiment
 3rd Field Artillery Regiment
 3rd Cavalry Regiment
 3rd Engineer Regiment
 3rd Transport Regiment
 Central Force
 39th Division - Lt Gen. Keisaku Murakami [1,4]
 39th Infantry Brigade Group:
 231st Infantry Regiment
 232nd Infantry Regiment
 233rd Infantry Regiment
 39th Recon Regiment 
 39th Field Artillery Regiment
 39th Military Engineer Regiment
 39th Transport Regiment
 Southern Pincer
 13th Division - General Shizuichi Tanaka [1,4]
 26th Infantry Brigade
 58th Infantry Regiment
 116th Infantry Regiment
 103rd Infantry Brigade
 65th Infantry Regiment
 104th Infantry Regiment
 19th Mountain Artillery Regiment
 17th Cavalry Regiment[1] 
 13th Engineer Regiment
 13th Transport Regiment
 20 Tanks [1] Possibly from 7th or 13th Tank Regiments [5]
 Ichang Column
 Ikeda Detachment - Major Gen. Naomi Ikeda / 6th Division [5]
 11th Infantry Brigade
 13th Infantry Regiment
 One battalion each from 47th, 23rd, 45th Infantry Regiments / 6th Div.
 One battalion of 2nd Independent Mountain Gun Regiment / 11th Army
 One platoon of 6th Cavalry Regiment / 6th Div.
 One company of 6th Engineer Regiment / 6th Div.
 Two companies of 6th Transport Regiment / 6th Div.
 Kansui(漢水) Detachment - Col. Higaki (17th Anchorage HQ)[5]
 17th Anchorage HQ 
 6th Reserve Battalion of Imperial Guard Division
 6th Independent Engineer Regiment 
 1st Company of 10th Independent Engineer Regiment 
 Five Surface Transport Units 
 Construction Transport Unit 
 9th Transport Supervision Unit

Navy
 1st China Expeditionary Fleet [5]
 NLF from 1st China Expeditionary Fleet[5]

Airforce: [3]
 3rd Hikodan - Major General Kuwana
 Headquarters in Hankou 
 At Hankou airfield:
 17th Dokuritsu Hiko Chutai [Reconnaissance squadron.] 
 44th Sentai (one reconnaissance and two direct cooperation units) 
 59th Sentai 
 1st Chutai   Nakajima Ki-27
 2nd Chutai   Nakajima Ki-27
 At Wuchang airfield:
 11th Sentai (less one chutai) 
 2nd Chutai   Nakajima Ki-27
 3rd Chutai   Nakajima Ki-27
 75th Sentai  [Light bomber unit]
 3rd Hikodan was directed to cooperate with the land operations of the 11th Army and suppress the enemy air force.

Other forces in the Ichang Campaign, (Security forces to replace offensive units.) 
 Yoshida Detachment - Col. Yoshida [5]
 61st Battalion / 14th Independent Mixed Brigade 
 (Sent from 14th Independent Mixed Brigade assigned to Juijiang area [2].)   
 40th Division(partial) - Lt. Gen Naojikiro Amaya [1,2,4]
 (Said to have been sent to Xinyang area at the end of May 1940. [1] This may have been a mistake for the Ogawa Detachment sent from 34th Division.)
 Ogawa Detachment - Col. Ogawa  [5]
 216th Infantry Regiment / 34th Division
 18th Independent Mixed Brigade - Major-General Koichi Kayashima [2,4]
 92nd Independent infantry battalion 
 93rd Independent infantry battalion 
 94th Independent infantry battalion 
 95th Independent infantry battalion 
 96th Independent infantry battalion
 Brigade artillery troops 
 Brigade engineer unit 
 Brigade communication unit
 The 18th Independent Mixed  Brigade: Formed on November 7, 1939,  and enrolled in the 11th Army order of battle, in the northern Jiujiang area. [2]  Said to have been sent from Wuning to Shayang area at the end of May 1940. [1]
 101st Mixed Brigade - Major General Matsuyama [5]
 China Stationed Infantry Battalion / 27th Division - Tianjin
 26th Independent Infantry Battalion / 7th Independent Mixed  Brigade - Huimin area
 From North China [5]
 Kurahashi Detachment - Col. Kurahashi
 60th Infantry Regiment / 15th Division
 From 13th Army [5]
 Matsui Detachment - Major General Matsui [5]
 22nd Infantry Group / 22nd Division - Hangchow 
 3 Battalions

 China 
(Mid April 1940)5th War Area - Li Tsung-jen
 2nd Army Group - Sun Lianzhong
 68th Corps - Liu Ju-ming
 119th Division 
 143rd Division
 27th Separate Brigade
 30th  Corps - Wang Chung-lien
 27th Division 
 30th Division
 31st Division
 31st Army Group - Tang En-po
 13th Corps - Chang Hsueh-chung
 89th Division 
 110th Division
 11th Separate Brigade
 85th  Corps - Wang Chung-lien
 4th Division 
 32nd Division
 11th Separate Brigade
 11th Army Group - Huang Qixiang
 92nd Corps - Li Hsien-chao
 21st Division 
 47th Division
 84th  Corps - Mo Shu-chieh
 178th Division 
 188th Division
 29th Army Group - Wang Zuanxu
 44th Corps - Liao Chen
 149th Division 
 150th Division
 67th Corps - Hsu Shao-tsung
 161st Division 
 162nd Division
 22nd Army Group - Sun Zhen
 45th Corps - Chen Ting-hsun
 125th Division 
 127th Division
 41st Corps - Sun Chen
 122nd Division 
 124th Division
 1st Guerrilla Division
 33rd  Army Group - Zhang Zizhong
 55th Corps - Tsao Fu-lin 
 29th Division 
 74th Division
 77th Corps - Feng Zhi'an
 37th Division 
 132nd Division
 179th Division 
 59th Corps - Huang Wei-kang
 38th Division 
 180th Division
 9th Cavalry Division 
 75th Corps - Chao Ai
 6th Division 
 13th Division
 4th Cavalry Division
 39th Corps - Liu Ho-ting
 56th Division
 River Defense Force - Kuo Chan(Mid April 1940)
 94th Corps - Li Chi-lan
 12th Division 
 185th Division
 55th Division
 26th Corps - Hsiao Chih-chu(Mid April 1940)
 23rd Division 
 41st Division
 44th  Division
 2nd Corps - Li Yen-nien
 76th Division
 33rd Division
 New 12th Corps - Cheng Tung-kuo
 1st Honor Division
 5th Division 
 18th Corps - Peng Shan 
 18th Division 
 77th Division
 199th Division
 Eastern Hupei Guerilla Force 
 7th Corps''' - Wang Tsan-pin
 171st Guerrilla Division 
 172nd Guerrilla Division
 3rd Guerrilla Division
 4th Guerrilla Division
 Commander Cheng Ju-hai
 16th Guerrilla Division 
 19th Guerrilla Division
 11th Guerrilla Regiment

Sources 
 [1] Hsu Long-hsuen and Chang Ming-kai, History of The Sino-Japanese War (1937-1945) 2nd Ed., 1971. Translated by Wen Ha-hsiung, Chung Wu Publishing; 33, 140th Lane, Tung-hwa Street, Taipei, Taiwan Republic of China. Page 334–339, Map 20, 21
 [2] IJA in China orbat, 1937 to 1945
 [3] Sino-Japanese Air War 1937 – 1945
 [4]  Generals from Japan (WWII)
 [6]  Campaign Of Zao-Yi (Zaoyang-Yichang)

Second Sino-Japanese War orders of battle